Jefferson Madeira da Silva, or simply Jefferson Madeira (born 15 February 1988) is a Brazilian football forward playing with Duque de Caxias
Born in Duque de Caxias, Madeira started his career playing with Sport Recife in 2007 making his debut in the Campeonato Brasileiro Série A.

After loan spells with Metropolitano and Treze during 2008, he joined in January 2009 FK Teleoptik - a club owned by FK Partizan Belgrade - playing in the 2008–09 Serbian League Belgrade playing along compatriots Washington Santana da Silva, Alex dos Santos Gonçalves and Elton Martins, helping Teleoptik to finish 2nd in the 2008–09 Serbian League Belgrade, one of Serbian 3rd tiers, thus earning promotion to the 2009–10 Serbian First League.

In summer 2009 he returned to Brazil and played until the end of the year with Olaria, before returning to Sport Recife.

References

External sources

Living people
1988 births
Brazilian footballers
Brazilian expatriate footballers
Association football forwards
Sport Club do Recife players
Clube Atlético Metropolitano players
Treze Futebol Clube players
Olaria Atlético Clube players
FK Teleoptik players
Expatriate footballers in Serbia
Association football midfielders
People from Duque de Caxias, Rio de Janeiro
Sportspeople from Rio de Janeiro (state)